More Work for the Undertaker is a crime novel by Margery Allingham, first published in 1948, in the United Kingdom by William Heinemann, London and in the United States  by Doubleday, New York. It is the thirteenth novel in the Albert Campion series.

The book focuses on Apron Street, an isolated neighbourhood in London.  Going "up Apron street" has become a byword for a criminal vanishing.  This proves to be done by the Bowels family, the undertakers of the title.  More sinister proves to be the effort of the local banker to eliminate the eccentric Palinode family, which has inherited shares of stock once thought worthless.  The banker proves also to be the moving force behind the service the Bowels family runs for criminals.

Note on the Title 
More Work for the Undertaker was the title of a comical 1895 music-hall song written by Fred W. Leigh (1871 - 1924)

The chorus of this song is traditionally sung by Yale when they are winning against Harvard.

References 
 Margery Allingham, More Work for the Undertaker, (London: William Heinemann, 1948)
 Margery Allingham, More Work for the Undertaker, (Vintage, Random House, 2007)

External links 
An Allingham bibliography, with dates and publishers, from the UK Margery Allingham Society

1948 British novels
Novels by Margery Allingham
Heinemann (publisher) books